William Edwin Pimm (10 December 1864 – 18 July 1952) was an English sport shooter, who competed in the 1908 Summer Olympics and 1912 Summer Olympics for Great Britain.

Career 
In the 1908 Olympics he won a gold medal in the team small-bore rifle event, was sixth in the stationary target small-bore rifle event, sixth in the moving target small-bore rifle event and 15th in the disappearing target small-bore rifle event. Four years later he won a gold medal in the 50 metre team small-bore rifle event, silver in the 25 metre team small-bore rifle event, was seventh in the 25 metre small-bore rifle event and 10th in the 50 metre rifle from the prone position event.

References

External links
profile
William Edwin Pimm on artnet

1864 births
1952 deaths
British male sport shooters
ISSF rifle shooters
Olympic shooters of Great Britain
Shooters at the 1908 Summer Olympics
Shooters at the 1912 Summer Olympics
English Olympic medallists
Olympic gold medallists for Great Britain
Olympic silver medallists for Great Britain
Olympic medalists in shooting
Medalists at the 1908 Summer Olympics
Medalists at the 1912 Summer Olympics
Sportspeople from London